Antony Lopez Peralta (born August 18, 1981) is a midfielder.

Career
He signed for Championnat National side Amiens SC in the summer of 2009 from Tours FC. On 13 May 2010 Championnat National club AS Cannes signed the midfielder from Amiens SC.

References

External links

1981 births
Living people
French footballers
Olympique Alès players
FC Istres players
AS Cherbourg Football players
Stade Lavallois players
Tours FC players
Amiens SC players
French people of Spanish descent
Association football midfielders